Khushboo or Khushbu Thakkar is an Indian television actress and former journalist. She has worked on Hongey Judaa Na Hum on Sony TV, and appeared in Rangrasiya as Rudra's sister-cousin Sunehri Ranawat on Colors TV, played role of Shalini Tripathi in Colors's new serial Ishq Ka Rang Safed, she played Ronita in Kuch Rang Pyar Ke Aise Bhi on Sony TV and Tanvi in TV, Biwi aur Main on SAB TV. Last she appeared in Bhutu on Zee Tv.

She has also appeared in Geet on Star One, Veera and Ek Doosre Se Karte Hain Pyaar Hum on Star Plus, Mrs. Kaushik Ki Paanch Bahuein and Sapne Suhane Ladakpan Ke on Zee TV, Arjun on Star Plus, Comedy Classes on Life OK, Mrs. Tendulkar on Sab TV, and a role on MTV Webbed, among others.

Personal life

Khushbu married her longtime partner in private ceremony on 10 December 2018. They attended the same college and were dating each other for a few years.

Television

Filmography

References

External links  
 
 Khushbu Thakkar  IMDb
 Kuch Rang Pyar Ke Aise bhi Complete Cast IMDb
 Khushbu Thakkar Instagram Instagram

Year of birth missing (living people)
Living people
21st-century Indian actresses
Actresses from Mumbai
Indian television actresses